Sunna Rannveig Davíðsdóttir (born 21 June 1985) is an Icelandic mixed martial artist who was signed with the Invicta, where she competes in the strawweight division.

Mixed martial arts career

Invicta FC
Prior to her professional debut, Davíðsdóttir participated in the 2015 IMMAF European Championships, competing at flyweight. She won the gold medal, winning a split decision against Ilaria Norcia in the quarterfinal and achieving TKO victories over Michaela Dostalova and Anja Saxmark in the semifinals and finals respectively.

Davíðsdóttir was scheduled to make her professional debut on 23 September 2016 against Ashley Greenway at Invicta FC 19: Maia vs. Modafferi. Davíðsdóttir won the fight by unanimous decision.

Davíðsdóttir was scheduled to make her second appearance with Invicta against Mallory Martin at Invicta FC 22: Evinger vs. Kunitskaya II. Davíðsdóttir won the fight by unanimous decision. The fight was later awarded "Fight of the Night" honors.

Davíðsdóttir was scheduled to fight Kelly D'Angelo at Invicta FC 24: Dudieva vs. Borella, in the latter's Invicta debut. Davíðsdóttir won the fight by unanimous decision. The fight once again earned "Fight of the Night" honors.

Davíðsdóttir returned after a two year layoff to take part in the Invicta FC Phoenix Series 1 tournament. She was scheduled to face Kailin Curran in the tournament semifinals. Davíðsdóttir lost the fight by split decision.

Championships and accomplishments

Mixed martial arts
IMMAF
 2015 IMMAF European Open Championships (52kg, Flyweight)

Invicta Fighting Championships
Fight of the Night (Two times) vs. Mallory Martin and Kelly D'Angelo

Awards
MMAViking
2016 Female Fighter of the Year
2017 Breakthrough Fighter of the Year

Mixed martial arts record

|-
| Win
| align=center| 3–0
| Kelly D'Angelo
| Decision (unanimous)
| Invicta FC 24: Dudieva vs. Borella
| 
| align=center|3
| align=center|5:00
| Kansas City, Missouri, United States
| Fight of the Night.
|-
| Win
| align=center| 2–0
| Mallory Martin
| Decision (unanimous)
| Invicta FC 22: Evinger vs. Kunitskaya II
| 
| align=center|3
| align=center|5:00
| Kansas City, Missouri, United States
| Fight of the Night.
|-
| Win
| align=center| 1–0
| Ashley Greenway
| Decision (unanimous)
| Invicta FC 19: Maia vs. Modafferi
| 
| align=center|3
| align=center|5:00
| Kansas City, Missouri, United States
|
|}

Amateur mixed martial arts record

|-
|Win
|align=center| 4-1
|Anja Saxmark
|TKO (Ground and pound)
|2015 IMMAF European Open Championships
|
|align=center|2
|align=center|2:32
|Wolverhampton, England
|Wins the IMMAF European Flyweight Championship
|-
|Win
|align=center| 3-1
|Michaela Dostalova
|TKO (Ground and pound)
|2015 IMMAF European Open Championships
|
|align=center|1
|align=center|2:48
|Wolverhampton, England
|IMMAF European Flyweight Championship Semifinal
|-
|Win
|align=center| 2-1
|Ilaria Norcia
|Decision (Split)
|2015 IMMAF European Open Championships
|
|align=center|3
|align=center|3:00
|Wolverhampton, England
|IMMAF European Flyweight Championship Quarterfinal
|-
|}

See also
 List of female mixed martial artists
 List of current Invicta FC fighters

References

External links
 
 Sunna Rannveig Davidsdottir at Invicta FC

1985 births
Living people
Sunna Davidsdottir
Strawweight mixed martial artists
Mixed martial artists utilizing Muay Thai
Mixed martial artists utilizing kickboxing
Mixed martial artists utilizing Brazilian jiu-jitsu
Flyweight kickboxers
Icelandic Muay Thai practitioners
Female Muay Thai practitioners
Sunna Davidsdottir
Sunna Davidsdottir
Sunna Davidsdottir